Daniel Coonan  is a British actor.

Early life
Coonan was brought up in Haringey, in north London, moving to Plymouth, Devon in his teens, where he took up acting lessons. He trained at the London Academy of Music and Dramatic Art.

Career
After graduating, Coonan spent over ten years working almost exclusively in theatre, working with companies including The National Theatre, The Royal Court Theatre and Howard Barker's theatre company, The Wrestling School. Coonan then had roles in various television series, including a wrongly convicted murderer in Silent Witness, an investigating policeman in the BBC crime drama Mayday, and a violent alcoholic in Mike Leigh's revival of his classic play Ecstasy, which Leigh directed.

In 2013, Coonan joined the cast of the BBC soap opera EastEnders, playing Carl White, having previously played David Priors in 2011. He was originally contracted to appear in 28 episodes as Carl over a six-month period, but filmed over 60 episodes. Coonan departed the show in January 2014. Since leaving, Coonan has again returned to the stage, playing 'Marco' in Arthur Miller's classic play 'A View From the Bridge' at The Liverpool Playhouse and  'Black Dog' in The Royal National Theatre's 2015 production of 'Treasure Island'.

In 2016 Coonan appeared in the Discovery Channel miniseries Harley and the Davidsons playing William A. Davidson, one of the founders of the Harley Davidson motorcycle company. He will be involved in filming History Channel's eight part drama documentary 'The War on Drugs' in early 2017  as well as the BBC drama 'Hard Sun', created by Neil Cross, the writer of 'Luther'.

Selected theatre

Selected television

References
http://www.hollywoodreporter.com/live-feed/discovery-channel-rounds-cast-harley-875027

External links

PW Productions

1974 births
Living people
People from Harringay
Male actors from Plymouth, Devon
English male soap opera actors